Belinda Bencic and Kateřina Siniaková were the defending champions, but Bencic chose not to participate this year. Siniaková played alongside Barbora Krejčíková, but lost in the first round to Margarita Gasparyan and Andrea Hlaváčková.
Gasparyan and Hlaváčková went on to win the title, defeating María Irigoyen and Paula Kania in the final, 6–4, 6–2.

Seeds

Draw

References 
 Main draw

Doubles